Lina Glushko (born 12 January 2000) is an Israeli tennis player. She has career-high WTA rankings of 272 in singles, and 408 in doubles.

Biography
Glushko's USSR-born parents Sergio and Olga, sister Julia, and brother Alex immigrated to Israel from Ukraine in 1999, one year before she was born. She graduated from Ironi Gimel High School in Modiin, Israel.

She served in the Israel Defense Forces (IDF).

She is the younger sister of Julia Glushko (10 years older), who was also a professional tennis player, and with whom she has teamed as a doubles partner. She was coached first by her father, and then by her brother.

In September 2017, she won the inaugural Anna and Michael Kahan Family Prize in Ramat Hasharon, claiming NIS 100,000 in support; Glushko was able to use the money to purchase equipment and to travel abroad for tournaments and training camps. She also represents Israel in the Fed Cup, where she has a win–loss record of 6–4.

Career 
She made her WTA Tour debut at the 2022 Internationaux de Strasbourg.

Performance timelines 
Only main-draw results in WTA Tour, Grand Slam tournaments, Fed Cup/Billie Jean King Cup and Olympic Games are included in win–loss records.

Singles 
Current after the 2022 Internationaux de Strasbourg.

ITF finals

Singles: 7 (2 titles, 6 runner-ups)

Doubles: 7 (3 titles, 5 runner-ups)

Notes

References

External links
 
 
 

2000 births
Living people
Israeli people of Ukrainian-Jewish descent
Israeli female tennis players
Sportspeople from Modi'in-Maccabim-Re'ut